Death by Design is the debut studio album of T.H.C., released on January 23, 1996 by Full Contact Records.

Reception
In reviewing Death by Design, Aiding & Abetting criticized the songwriting of the slower songs but said "T.H.C. packs enough distortion and speed into the songs to satisfy any fan of that kind of electronic madness." A critic at Sonic Boom gave the album a mixed review, saying "sure the music is sparse, dancey as hell, and sometimes drifts towards an ambient style setting but without any depth of layering what does the music actually offer to the audience?" The critic concluded by stating "the few ambient tracks on this album do make for an excellent stereophonic experience and tend to contain a great deal more complexity which I think are the saving grace for this album."

Track listing

Personnel 
Adapted from the Death by Design liner notes.

T.H.C.
 Jeremy Daw – additional programming (1, 3, 5, 8)
 George Sarah – producer, recording (2, 6)

Additional performers
 Sarah Folkman – vocals (3)

Production and design
 Zalman Fishman – executive-producer
 Lorraine Kay – cover art, illustrations
 Timothy Wiles (as Q) – recording (2, 4, 6, 7, 9), additional programming (4, 7, 9)

Release history

References

External links 
 
 Death by Design at iTunes

1996 debut albums
T.H.C. (band) albums
Full Contact Records albums